Straker is a surname.

The surname of Straker was derived from the Old English word 'stracian' an occupational name 'the striker'. Occupational surnames refer directly to the particular trade or occupation followed by the first bearer of the name.

The surname Straker was first found in Lancashire where they held a family seat as Lords of the Manor. The Saxon influence of English history diminished after the Battle of Hastings in 1066. The language of the courts was French for the next three centuries and the Norman ambience prevailed. But Saxon surnames survived and the family name was first referenced in the year 1246 when Robert Straker held lands.

Notable people with the surname include:

 Anthony Straker, English-born Grenadian footballer
 Arthur Straker, English first-class cricket player
 D. Augustus Straker, Barbados-born lawyer and jurist, first black lawyer to appear before the Michigan Supreme Court
 Granville Straker, American music businessman and record producer
 Les Straker, baseball player
 Sir Louis Straker, deputy prime minister and foreign minister of Saint Vincent and the Grenadines
 Nick Straker, musician
 Nick Straker Band

Fictional characters:
 Edward "Ed" Straker and his son Johnny Straker, fictional characters in the television series UFO
 Kevin Straker, the name of the "Ken" character in the Japanese version of the video game Street Fighter 2010
 Richard Straker, a character in Stephen King’s 1975 horror novel ’Salem’s Lot.

See also
Straker-Squire, a former car makers in England
Strake (disambiguation)

References